Joshua Penn (born November 25, 2000) is an American professional soccer player who currently plays for Portland Timbers 2 in MLS Next Pro.

Career
On February 21, 2019, Penn joined USL Championship side Indy Eleven on an USL academy contract. He stayed with the club prior to playing college soccer at Indiana University.

Following one season with the Hoosiers, Penn returned to Indy Eleven, signing a professional contract with the club on August 25, 2020.

Penn was eligible for the 2021 MLS SuperDraft and was selected 10th overall by Inter Miami CF on January 21, 2021. On February 12, 2021, he signed with the club after his contract with Indy Eleven was terminated.

On July 30, 2021, Penn joined USL Championship side Charleston Battery on loan for the remainder of the 2021 season.

Following the 2021 season, Penn's contract option was declined by Miami.

On March 8, 2022, Penn signed with Chicago Fire II  ahead of their upcoming inaugural season in the MLS Next Pro.

On March 3, 2023, it was announced that Penn had signed with MLS Next Pro side Portland Timbers 2 for their 2023 season.

Career statistics

Club

References

External links 
 Joshua Penn at Indiana University Athletics

2000 births
Living people
Indy Eleven players
Indiana Hoosiers men's soccer players
USL Championship players
American soccer players
Association football forwards
Sportspeople from Naperville, Illinois
Soccer players from Illinois
Inter Miami CF draft picks
Inter Miami CF players
Major League Soccer players
Inter Miami CF II players
USL League One players
Charleston Battery players
MLS Next Pro players
Chicago Fire FC II players
Portland Timbers 2 players